Qızıltorpaq (known as Dikdaş until 2011) is a village in the Gadabay Rayon of Azerbaijan. The village forms part of the municipality of Qaraməmmədli.

References 

Populated places in Gadabay District